The European Youth Table Tennis Championships are held among cadets (under 15) and juniors (under 18). The first edition of the tournament was held in 1955 in Stuttgart and since then is held yearly in most cases.

Currently, the championships include team, doubles and singles events for both genders and age classes as well as a mixed doubles event. There are also consolation events for players defeated in the qualifying stages and in the first round of the singles events.

The final ranking of the junior boys' and girls' team events determines the qualification for the same year's World Youth Championships.

Junior results

Cadet results

See also
 Table tennis
 European Table Tennis Union
 World Table Tennis Championships
 List of table tennis players

References
ETTU Website

table tennis
Table tennis competitions